Wolf's Head Society is a senior society at Yale University in New Haven, Connecticut. The society is one of the reputed "Big Three" societies at Yale, along with Skull and Bones and Scroll and Key. Active undergraduate membership is elected annually with sixteen Yale University students, typically rising seniors. Honorary members are elected.

The current delegation spends its year together answerable to an alumni association. Some past members have gained prominence in athletics, business, the fine and literary arts, higher education, journalism, and politics.

History
Fifteen rising seniors from the Yale Class of 1884, with help from members of the Yale Class of 1883 who were considered publicly possible taps for the older societies, abetted the creation of The Third Society. The society changed its name to Wolf's Head five years later.

The effort was aided by more than 300 Yale College alumni and a few Yale Law School faculty, in part to counter the dominance of the Skull and Bones Society in undergraduate and university affairs.

The founding defeated the last attempt by the administration or the student body to abolish secret or senior societies at Yale.   The tradition continued of creating and sustaining a society if enough potential rising seniors thought they had been overlooked: Bones was established in 1832 after a dispute over selections for Phi Beta Kappa awards; Scroll and Key Society, the second society at Yale, was established in 1841 after a dispute over elections to Bones.

The Third Society's founding was motivated in part by sentiment among some young men that they deserved insider status. "[A] certain limited number were firmly convinced that there had been an appalling miscarriage of justice in their individual omission from the category of the elect," some founders agreed.

Antecedents
Before the founding in 1780 at Yale of the Connecticut Alpha chapter of Phi Beta Kappa, the second chapter established after that society's founding in 1776 (which still practices a secret handshake among members), Yale College students established and joined literary societies. By the 1830s, the campus literary societies Linonia, Brothers in Unity, and Calliopean had lost stature. Calliopean folded in 1853, and the others shut down after the American Civil War. Calliopean, Linonia, and Brothers in Unity existed respectively: 1819–1853, 1768–1878, and 1735–1868.

From the mid-1840s until 1883, several societies were started, but each failed to sustain the interest of liberal arts students at Yale College, broadly known as the Academical Department. Star and Dart, Sword and Crown, Tea-Kettle, Spade and Grave, and E.T.L. disbanded.

Phi Beta Kappa was inactive at Yale from 1871 to 1884, coinciding in part with a national reorganization of the society. In the 1820s, Anti-Masonic agitation sweeping across the United States prompted PBK to examine the role of secrecy in its proceedings. Associated with PBK's national reorganization in 1881, secrecy disappeared as a signature among all chapters, quelling rivalry with collegiate fraternities, clubs and societies. Hence, secrecy was soon shelved at the Yale chapter. PBK exists today, without any secrecy, as an academic honor society.

Beginning in the 1850s, the Yale undergraduate student body grew more diverse. The college was becoming an institution of national rather than regional importance. Students who hailed from environs beyond New England or who were not Congregationalist or Presbyterian entered the college in large numbers.

The faculty and administration were dominated by alumni of Bones, numbering four out of five faculty members between 1865 and 1916. Bones alumni were university secretaries from 1869 to 1921. Bones alumni were university treasurers for forty-three of the forty-eight years between 1862 - 1910. Five of the first six Yale Corporation elected Alumni Fellows were members of Bones.

Dissatisfaction grew: In 1873, The Iconoclast, a student paper published once, advocated for the abolition of the society system. It opined: "Out of every class Skull and Bones takes its men...They have obtained control of Yale. Its business is performed by them. Money paid to the college must pass into their hands, and be subject to their will....It is Yale College against Skull and Bones!! We ask all men, as a question of right, which should be allowed to live?" A memoir of the first college daily's birth records its first year strategy to "rag" the societies.

The Class of 1884 agreed to support another revolt against the society system with a vote of no confidence to coincide with its graduation. It had been understood that the society system was beyond reform and might well be abolished.

A spirited defense of the society system appeared in the  issue of The New Englander, written and published by members of Scroll and Key. Several periodicals reported regularly on the situation.

Establishment
The initial delegation, including ten Class Day officers from the Class of 1884 and led by Edwin Albert Merritt, met in secret during their senior year with the aid of members of the Class of 1883 who were "eager to start a society provided the evil features of the old societies would be eliminated. [The graduating and rising seniors] were unanimous on this point." Included among the supporters from the Class of 1883 were members touted as sure selections to Bones or Keys by the publishers of the Horoscope, an undergraduate publication that provided feature material on the most likely taps. The pro-society seniors won the Class Day vote, 67 - 50.

The new society was conceived on or about June 5, 1883. Among undergraduates the fledgling group was known as the "Fox and Grapes" for the Aesopian fable of jealousy.

The two older societies suffered by comparison with Wolf's Head.  The New Haven Register reported in 1886: "Wolf's Head is not as far out of the world, in respect to its public doings, as are [Bones and Keys]. There is a sufficient veil of secrecy drawn around its mechanism, however, to class it with the secret societies, and this gives it a stability and respectability in Yale College circles that it might not have otherwise...." The society was managed similarly to finals clubs associated with the Sheffield Scientific School; however, it soon took on almost all aspects of the older societies.

Early stature
The Third Society sat at the apex of a social pyramid bricked by junior societies (sophomore societies were abolished in 1875, freshman societies in 1880), campus organizations, athletic teams, clubs, and fraternities.

In 1888, the society changed its name to Wolf's Head Society, consonant with the approval among undergraduates of the society's pin, a stylized wolf's head on an inverted ankh, an Egyptian hieroglyphic known as the Egyptian Cross or "the key of life". The earliest undergraduate members allowed fellow schoolmates to handle the pin, a specific refutation of pin display by the older societies. Eternal life is symbolized rather than death or erudition. A Roman fasces had been considered as a design element for the pin.

Point of view
Many pioneering and subsequent members mocked as "poppycock" (from the Dutch for "soft excrement") the seemingly Masonic-inspired rituals and atmosphere associated with Skull and Bones. In their The Pirates of Penzance prank, Wolf's Head members persuaded the thespian pirate king to display the numbers 322 (part of the emblem of Skull and Bones) below a skull and crossbones at a local theatre. In another example, Yale President A. Whitney Griswold's deprecated the rituals as "bonesy bullshit" and "Dink Stover crap" coloring undergraduate life.

Wolf's Head did maintain many traditional practices, such as the Thursday and Sunday meetings, which were common among its peers. Paul Moore, Jr., long-time Senior Fellow and successor trustee (1964 - 1990) for the Yale Corporation and long-tenured bishop in the Episcopal Church (United States), recalled the night before he first encountered combat in World War II: "I spent the evening on board ship being quizzed by [a friend from Harvard] about what went on in Wolf's Head. He could not believe I would hold back such irrelevant secrets the night before I faced possible death."

The Halls

Previous Tomb

The "Old Hall" was erected within months of the founding. The older Academical Department societies met originally for decades in rented quarters near campus. Skull and Bones opened its tomb in 1856, more than two decades after its founding. Scroll and Key did likewise; it opened its tomb in 1869 more than two decades after the society's founding.

The former or "Old Hall", located at 77 Prospect Street, across the street from the Grove Street Cemetery, was a Richardsonian Romanesque building commissioned for the Phelps Trust Association and designed by the architectural firm McKim, Mead and White. It was completed in 1884.  It was purchased by the university in 1924, rented to Chi Psi fraternity (1924–29), Book and Bond (defunct society) (1934–35), and Vernon Hall (now Myth and Sword) (1944–54). It currently houses the Yale Institution for Social and Policy Studies.

A building with narrow windows, the "Old Hall" was noted as "the most modern and handsomest" of the society domiciles by The New York Times in 1903. The building was erected in 1884 soon after the founding members secured financing.
Bertram Goodhue, architect, designed the "New Hall", ca. 1924; it was built posthumously. Goodhue was a protege of James Renwick Jr., architect of the first St. Anthony Hall chapter house in New York City.
The building has stone wall and wrought iron fencing, and is central to the largest secret society compound on campus. The compound commands the most prominent location on campus beyond Harkness Tower, the very icon of Yale, and the Memorial Quadrangle.

Current Tomb

The "New Hall" opened in the mid-1920s and sits fronted by York Street surrounded by the Yale Daily News Briton Hadden Memorial building, and the Yale Drama School and theatre, both gifts to Yale from Edward Harkness. It is near the former homes of the Fence Club (or Psi Upsilon, 224 York Street), DKE (232 York Street) and Zeta Psi (212 York Street).

Membership
The society has been reputed to tap the gregarious "prep school type". Past members were associated intimately with the: coeducation of Yale College, establishment of the Yale residential college system and the Harvard house system, founding of the Elizabethan Club, and founding of the Yale Political Union. This was Yale's last all-male society; it has tapped women since the spring of 1992.

Edward John Phelps, Envoy to the Court of St. James's, accepted the offer in 1885 to be namesake to the Wolf's Head alumni association. The Phelps Association, as of January 2016, holds in trust nearly seven million dollars, second among Yale societies or clubs.

Yale societies contrast sharply with Harvard finals clubs on membership criteria. Contributions to undergraduate life has been historically among the criteria for membership in Yale societies. Finals clubs overlook that quality among prospective members.

Notable members

Malcolm Baldrige, Jr., former U.S. Secretary of Commerce 
Leigh Bardugo (1997), Israeli-American author 
Charles L. Bartlett, Pulitzer Prize winning journalist
Donald Beer (1957), Competition Rower and Olympic Champion 
Stephen Vincent Benét (1919), Pulitzer Prize–winning American poet, short story writer, and novelist 
Clarence Winthrop Bowen (1883), American author of historical essays 
David Josiah Brewer, Justice of the US Supreme Court
James Smith Bush (1844), Episcopal priest 
William H.T. Bush (1950), Businessperson
John Charlesworth (1929), American football player 
Thomas Charlton (1956), competition rower and Olympic medalist 
Sam Chauncey (1957), Yale administrator 
John Proctor Clarke, Justice of the New York Supreme Court 
Alexander Smith Cochran (1896), manufacturer and philanthropist 
Erastus Corning 2nd (1932), New York politician 
Parker Corning (1895), businessman and US Representative 
Mark Dayton (1978), retired Minnesota senator and governor
Robert Fiske (1952), attorney and law partner 
William Clay Ford (1949), businessman and heir 
Richard Gilder (1954), philanthropist and businessman
Paul Goldberger (1972), architecture critic 
A. Conger Goodyear (1899), philanthropist and 1st President of Museum of Modern Art 
A. Whitney Griswold (1929), 16th President of Yale 
Edwin S. Grosvenor (1973), President and Editor-in-Chief of American Heritage
Ashbel Green Gulliver (1919), dean of Yale Law School 
Charles Harkness (1883), investor and heir 
Edward Harkness (1896), philanthropist and major benefactor to Yale 
William L. Harkness, American businessman 
Robert Maynard Hutchins (1921), collegiate administrator and president of the University of Chicago 
Charles Edward Ives (1898), American modernist composer 
Dick Jauron (1973), American football player 
William Woolsey Johnson, American mathematician 
Rashid Khalidi (1970), Palestinian American historian 
Lewis Lehrman, investment banker and politician 
Christopher Lydon, media personality and commentator 
Douglas MacArthur II (1932), American diplomat 
Wayne MacVeagh, American politician and former United States Attorney General 
William Matthews (1965), poet, winner of the Ruth Lilly Poetry Prize
Edwin Merritt (1884), New York Politician 
Clark Millikan (1924), American academic 
Roger Milliken (1937), American heir, industrialist, and businessman 
Douglas Moore (1915), composer and author 
Paul Moore, American bishop 
Paul Moore, Sr. (1908), American businessman 
Jack Morrison (1967), American ice hockey Olympic athlete 
Thruston Morton (1929), US Senator 
Rogers C. B. Morton, U.S. Representative, Secretary of Interior and Secretary of Commerce
Edward John Phelps, Lawyer and diplomat 
Philip W. Pillsbury (1924), Chair of Pillsbury Company 
Ducky Pond (1925), American football and baseball player 
Geoffrey Robinson, British politician and businessperson
Benno C. Schmidt, Jr., 20th President of Yale 
Kurt Schmoke (1971), American lawyer and politician 
Raymond Seitz, (1963), American Ambassador to the United Kingdom
Edmund Clarence Stedman, American poet, critic, essayist, banker, and scientist 
Tom Steyer (1979), American business man and liberal political activist 
William Earl Dodge Stokes, Businessman and urban developer 
Sam Wagstaff, American art curator and collector 
Rusty Wailes (1958), American rower
Clarissa Ward (2002), Emmy award-winning  American journalist
Arthur Williams Wright (1859), American physicist
Douglas Wick (1976) Academy Award-winning film producer
Doug Wright (1985), Pulitzer Prize winning  American playwright, librettist, and screenwriter
William Wrigley III (1954), president of the Wm. Wrigley Jr. Company

Notes

References
Skulls and Keys, David Alan Richards, Pegasus Books Ltd., 2017. 
Insiders and Outsiders in American Historical Narrative and American History, R. Laurence Moore, The American Historical Review (Apr. 1982).
Secrets of the Tomb: Skull and Bones, the Ivy League, and the Hidden Paths of Power, Alexandra Robbins,  Little, Brown, Boston, MA, 2002. 
The Power Elite, C. Wright Mills, Oxford University Press, 1956. , 
Tycoons: How Andrew Carnegie, John D. Rockefeller, Jay Gould, and J.P. Morgan invented the American supereconomy, Charles R. Morris, H. Holt and Co., New York, 2005. 
On Bullshit, Harry G. Frankfurt, Princeton University Press, Princeton, 2005. 
My Harvard, My Yale, Diana DuBois, editor, Random House, NY, NY, 1982. 
Dear Wolf's Head, by Karolina Ksiazek, Yale Daily News weekend section, datelined Thursday, May 2, 2013.

1883 establishments in the United States
Secret societies at Yale
Student organizations established in 1883